Guy Christian Zock à Bep (born 6 May 1994), better known as Christian Zock, is a Cameroonian professional footballer who plays as a midfielder for Swiss club Yverdon-Sport.

Professional career
After beginning his career in Cameroon with AS Fortuna Mfou and Cosmos de Bafia, Zock moved to Switzerland with FC Schaffhausen in 2016. After a successful debut season, he moved to FC Sion on 15 June 2017 in the Swiss Super League. Zock made his professional debut for Sion in a 1-1 Swiss Super League tie with FC Lausanne-Sport on 27 September 2017.

On 27 August 2021, he signed with Yverdon-Sport.

International career
Zock made his debut for the Cameroon national football team in a friendly 1–0 win over Indonesia on 25 March 2015.

References

External links
 
 
 SFL Profile
 FC Sion Profile

1994 births
Living people
Cameroonian footballers
Cameroon international footballers
Association football midfielders
FC Schaffhausen players
FC Sion players
Yverdon-Sport FC players
Swiss Super League players
Swiss Challenge League players
Elite One players
Cameroonian expatriate footballers
Cameroonian expatriate sportspeople in Switzerland
Expatriate footballers in Switzerland